The Beth Yaakov Synagogue is located in the heart of the city of Geneva. It has also been known as the Grande Synagogue. It was built between 1858 and 1859 for the Ashkenazi Jewish community, which comprised about 200 people at the time of the synagogue's construction.

Architecture 

The architecture a mix of Moorish Revival architecture and Byzantine architecture. The synagogue was designed by the Swiss Architect Jean Henri Bachofen. At the entrance one can see Moorish style Arches. The platform for reading of the Torah (the bimah) is located in front of the Torah ark, opposite the main entrance. This style was adopted later in the history of world Synagogues, since the Bimah was usually built in the middle of the congregation. Women have their own sections on both sides of the prayer hall. The building has been registered as a Historic monument (Switzerland) because of its architecture.

Photo gallery

References 
http://www.sacred-destinations.com/switzerland/geneva-grande-synagogue.htm

Ashkenazi Jewish culture in Switzerland
Ashkenazi synagogues
Synagogues in Switzerland
Buildings and structures in Geneva
Religious buildings and structures in Geneva
Synagogues completed in 1859
Moorish Revival synagogues
Byzantine Revival synagogues
19th-century architecture in Switzerland